Vesle Knutsholstinden is a mountain in Vågå Municipality in Innlandet county, Norway. The mountain is surrounded by several other notable mountains including Skarvflytindene to the northeast, Leirungstinden to the east, Leirungskampen to the southeast, Kvitskardtinden and Mesmogtinden to the southwest, Store Svartdalspiggen to the west, and Nordre Knutsholstinden and Store Knutsholstinden to the northwest.

Name
The first element is the genitive of the name of the large gorge Knutsholet. The last element is the finite form of tind which means 'mountain peak'. The name of the gorge is a compound of the male name Knut and hol which means 'hole', 'hollow', or 'gorge'. The reason for the name, and who the person Knut was, is unknown. The prefix vesle means 'small' or 'little'.

See also
List of mountains of Norway by height

References

Jotunheimen
Vågå
Mountains of Innlandet